My Guardian Anger is the third studio album by the Polish symphonic black metal group Lux Occulta, and the first with newcomers Martin and Vogg from Decapitated.

Some releases of the album have "Heart of the Devil" and "Love (Garden of Aphrodite)" (from Maior Arcana) as bonus tracks. Note that, at least on the 2002 Metal Mind release, these are labelled in the wrong order; "Love (Garden of Aphrodite)" is track ten, despite being labelled as track nine. "Heart of the Devil" is a Danzig cover.

Track listing
 The Heresiarch  – 6:26
 Kiss My Sword  – 5:36
 Triangle  – 1:08
 The Opening of Eleventh Sephirah  – 9:34
 Nude Sophia  – 5:52
 Cube  – 1:04
 Library on Fire  – 7:10
 Mane-Tekel-Fares  – 9:12

Personnel

Lux Occulta
Fool: Vocals
Magician: Rhythm Guitar
Devil: Lead Guitar
Hermit: Keyboards
Sun: Bass
Death: Drums

1999 albums
Lux Occulta albums